Le Le Hlaing (born 24 March 1997) is a Burmese footballer who plays as a midfielder. She has been a member of the Myanmar women's national team.

International career
Le Le Hlaing represented Myanmar at the 2013 AFC U-16 Women's Championship and two AFC U-19 Women's Championship editions (2013 and 2015). She capped at senior level during the 2018 AFC Women's Asian Cup qualification and the 2020 AFC Women's Olympic Qualifying Tournament (first round and second round).

International goals
Scores and results list Myanmar's goal tally first.

See also
List of Myanmar women's international footballers

References

1997 births
Living people
Women's association football midfielders
Burmese women's footballers
People from Ayeyarwady Region
Myanmar women's international footballers